Peter Voss, Thief of Millions is a 1958 West German comedy crime film directed by Wolfgang Becker and starring O. W. Fischer, Ingrid Andree and Margit Saad. It was based on the 1913 novel Peter Voss, Thief of Millions by Ewald Gerhard Seeliger, which had been previously adapted into three films. The film was a popular success, and was followed by a sequel Peter Voss, Hero of the Day with Fischer reprising his role.

It was shot at the Bavaria Studios in Munich. While location shooting took place at a variety of settings including Lisbon, Rio de Janeiro, Mexico City, Tokyo, Hong Kong, Barcelona, Genoa and Marseille. The film's sets were designed by the art directors Hans Jürgen Kiebach, Hans Kuhnert and Karl Schneider. Originally Eddie Constantine had been intended to play the title role, but at the last minute his unavailability led to the casting of Fischer in his place.

Cast
 O. W. Fischer as Peter Voss
 Ingrid Andree as Barbara Rottmann
 Margit Saad as Marion
 Mara Lane as Monique
 Peter Mosbacher as The Baron
 Peter Carsten as Willy
 Henri Cogan as Otto
 Boy Gobert as Ramon Cadalso
 Hans Leibelt as Mr. Rottmann
 Ludwig Linkmann as Van Zanten
 Franz-Otto Krüger as Uhl
 Walter Giller as Bobby Dodd

References

Bibliography
 Goble, Alan. The Complete Index to Literary Sources in Film. Walter de Gruyter, 1999.
 Popa, Dorin. O.W. Fischer: seine Filme, sein Leben. Wilhelm Heyne, 1989.

External links
 

1950s adventure comedy films
1950s crime comedy films
German adventure comedy films
German crime comedy films
West German films
Films based on German novels
Remakes of German films
Films set in Rio de Janeiro (city)
Films set in Hong Kong
UFA GmbH films
1950s German-language films
Films directed by Wolfgang Becker (director, born 1910)
1950s German films
Films shot at Bavaria Studios